Geonemertes is a genus of nemerteans belonging to the family Prosorhochmidae.

The species of this genus are found in all world oceans.

Species:

Geonemertes caeca 
Geonemertes graffi 
Geonemertes pelaensis 
Geonemertes peradeniya 
Geonemertes philippinensis 
Geonemertes rodericana 
Geonemertes spirospermia

References

Prosorhochmidae
Nemertea genera